The David G. Raney House  is a historic site in Apalachicola, Florida, United States, located at the southwest corner of Market Street and Avenue F. On September 22, 1972, it was added to the U.S. National Register of Historic Places.

The Apalachicola Area Historical Society operates the house as the Raney House Museum, featuring 19th century furnishings, decorations, artifacts and documents. Admission is free.

References

External links

Florida's Office of Cultural and Historical Programs
Franklin County listings
Franklin County markers
Raney House Museum

Houses on the National Register of Historic Places in Florida
Museums in Apalachicola, Florida
Historic house museums in Florida
Historical society museums in Florida
Historic American Buildings Survey in Florida
Houses in Franklin County, Florida
National Register of Historic Places in Franklin County, Florida
1840 establishments in Florida Territory